The 2008 North Carolina Republican presidential primary took place on May 6, 2008.

Results

* Candidate dropped out of the race before the primary

See also
 North Carolina Democratic primary, 2008
 Republican Party (United States) presidential primaries, 2008
 Super Tuesday III, 2008

References

North Carolina
2008 North Carolina elections
North Carolina Republican primaries